Ascorbate peroxidase (or L-ascorbate peroxidase, APX) is an enzyme that catalyzes the chemical reaction

L-ascorbate + H2O2  dehydroascorbate + 2 H2O

It is a member of the family of heme-containing peroxidases. Heme peroxidases catalyse the H2O2-dependent oxidation of a wide range of different, usually organic, substrates in biology.

This enzyme belongs to the family of oxidoreductases, specifically those acting on a peroxide as acceptor (peroxidases).  The systematic name of this enzyme class is L-ascorbate:hydrogen-peroxide oxidoreductase. Other names in common use include L-ascorbic acid peroxidase, L-ascorbic acid-specific peroxidase, ascorbate peroxidase, and ascorbic acid peroxidase.  This enzyme participates in ascorbate and aldarate metabolism.

Overview
Ascorbate-dependent peroxidase activity was first reported in 1979,, more than 150 years after the first observation of peroxidase activity in horseradish plants and almost 40 years after the discovery of the closely related cytochrome c peroxidase enzyme.

Peroxidases have been classified into three types (class I, class II and class III): ascorbate peroxidases is a class I peroxidase enzyme. APXs catalyse the H2O2-dependent oxidation of ascorbate in plants, algae and certain cyanobacteria. APX has high sequence identity to cytochrome c peroxidase, which is also a class I peroxidase enzyme. Under physiological conditions, the immediate product of the reaction, the monodehydroascorbate radical, is reduced back to ascorbate by a monodehydroascorbate reductase (monodehydroascorbate reductase (NADH)) enzyme. In the absence of a reductase, two monodehydroascorbate radicals disproportionate rapidly to dehydroascorbic acid and ascorbate. APX is an integral component of the glutathione-ascorbate cycle.

Substrate specificity
APX enzymes show high specificity for ascorbate as an electron donor, but most APXs will also oxidise other organic substrates that are more characteristic of the class III peroxidases (such as horseradish peroxidase), in some cases at rates comparable to that of ascorbate itself. This means that defining an enzyme as an APX is not straightforward, but is usually applied when the specific activity for ascorbate is higher than that for other substrates. Some proteins from the APX family lack the ascorbate-binding amino acid residues suggesting that they might oxidize other molecules than ascorbate.

Mechanism
Most of the information on mechanism comes from work on the pea cytosolic and soybean cytosolic enzymes. The mechanism of oxidation of ascorbate is achieved by means of an oxidized Compound I intermediate, which is subsequently reduced by substrate in two, sequential single electron transfer steps (equations [1]–[3], where HS = substrate and S• = one electron oxidised form of substrate).

APX + H2O2 → Compound I + H2O  [1]

Compound I + HS → Compound II + S•  [2]

Compound II + HS → APX + S• + H2O  [3]

In ascorbate peroxidase, Compound I is a transient (green) species and contains a high-valent iron species (known as ferryl heme, FeIV) and a porphyrin pi-cation radical,, as found in horseradish peroxidase. Compound II contains only the ferryl heme.

Structural information

The structure of pea cytosolic APX was reported in 1995. The binding interaction of soybean cytosolic APX with its physiological substrate, ascorbate, and with a number of other substrates are also known.

Applications in cellular imaging

Both pea APX and soybean APX have been used in electron microscopy studies for cellular imaging.

See also 

 Cytochrome c peroxidase
 Manganese peroxidase

References

Further reading

External links 
EC 1.11.1.11 
L-ascorbate peroxidase (EC-Number 1.11.1.11 )

EC 1.11.1
Enzymes of known structure